New Zealand mine disaster may refer to:

 Kaitangata Mine disaster, 1879
 Brunner Mine disaster, 1896
 Ralph Mine disaster, Huntly, New Zealand, 1914
 Dobson, New Zealand coal mine, 1926
 Glen Afton coal mine, 1939
 Strongman Mine gas explosion, 1967
 Pike River Mine disaster, 2010

See also
 Mining in New Zealand § Accidents